Stemming from its nickname as "The Heights," persons affiliated with Boston College
have been referred to as Heightsmen, Heightswomen, Heightsonians and Eagles, the latter in reference to the University's mascot, the Eagle. The following is a partial list of notable alumni and faculty.

Notable Boston College alumni

Arts and literature
 Gretchen Andrew, 2010, painter and search engine artist
 James Balog, 1974, photographer
 Joseph Bottum, Ph.D. 1994, writer
 Brendan Galvin, 1960, 76 poet, 2005 National Book Award finalist
 George V. Higgins, 1961, J.D. 1967, novelist
 Mary Elizabeth Hirsh, novelist
 Joseph McLellan, 1951, M.A. 1953, music critic, The Washington Post
 Brian Murphy, nonfiction writer, essayist
 David Plante, 1961, novelist
 Maurice Sagoff, poet
 Mary Sherman, artist and curator
 Elliot Silverstein, 1949, director; president, Artists Rights Foundation
 Karen Sosnoski, author, radio contributor and filmmaker
 C. Dale Young, 1991, poet, physician, editor

Business
 Nikesh Arora, 1995, President, Global Sales Operations and Business Development, Google
 Richard Berman, J.D. 1969, CEO, NexMed
 Wayne Budd, 1963, executive vice president, John Hancock Financial Services
 Kathleen Corbet, 1982, CEO, fixed income division, Alliance Capital Management
 Joseph Donahue, S.B. 1978, founder, president, Microtech
 Stephen L. Green, J.D. 1962, founder of S.L. Green Realty
Robert B. Ford, Chief Executive Officer of Abbott Laboratories
 Charlie Jacobs, Principal, Boston Bruins, Delaware North Companies
 Christopher G. Kennedy, 1986, President of Merchandise Mart Properties, Inc., a subsidiary of Vornado Realty Trust, and son of Robert F. Kennedy
 Ronald Logue, S.B. 1967, M.B.A. 1974, Chairman and former CEO, State Street Corporation
 David H. Long, CEO of Liberty Mutual Group 
 Karen S. Lynch, 1984, President and CEO of CVS Health
 Peter Lynch, 1965, mutual fund manager for Fidelity
 John Mara, 1976, president, CEO, and co-owner, New York Giants
 Harry Markopolos, 1997, Bernard Madoff whistleblower to SEC
 Denise Morrison, 1975, President and CEO, Campbell Soup Company
 Denis O'Brien, MBA 1982, Chairman, Digicel
 Catherine Rénier, MBA 1999, CEO Jaeger-LeCoultre
 Ferit Şahenk, 1989, head of Turkey's Dogus Holding conglomerate
 Philip W. Schiller, B.S. 1982, vice president of Apple Computer
 Bill Simon, J.D. 1982, businessman and former gubernatorial candidate in California
 Patrick Stokes, 1964, president, Anheuser-Busch
 Richard Syron, 1966, chairman, president and CEO, Thermo Electron Corporation; currently CEO of Freddie Mac

Education
 Harold Attridge, 1967, dean, Divinity School, Yale University
 William Bulger, 1958, professor, Boston College; former president of University of Massachusetts
 Barry Corey, Ph.D. 1992, President of Biola University
 Peter Dervan, 1967, former chairman, division of chemistry and chemical engineering, California Institute of Technology
 Robert Drinan, SJ, 1942, former dean, Boston College Law School
Francis Kilcoyne, President of Brooklyn College
 Paul J. LeBlanc, president, Southern New Hampshire University; former president of Marlboro College
 Brian Linnane, SJ, 1977, president, Loyola University Maryland
 Joseph M. McShane, SJ, 1972, president, Fordham University, former president of the University of Scranton
 Ernest Moniz, 1966, United States Secretary of Energy under Barack Obama; chair, Physics Department, MIT; director, Bates Linear Accelerator 
 J. Keith Motley, Ph.D. 1999, chancellor, University of Massachusetts Boston; first African-American chancellor at UMass Boston
 Vincent Phillip Muñoz (MA 1995), Tocqueville Associate Professor of Religion & Public Life in the Department of Political Science at the University of Notre Dame
 Thomas P. O'Malley, SJ, 1951, former president, John Carroll and Loyola Marymount universities
 Michael P. Walsh, SJ, 1929, former president, Boston College and Fordham University

Entertainment
 Alex Riley, 2002, professional wrestler and actor 
 Ayla Brown, 2010, singer, American Idol
 P. J. Byrne, 1996, film and television actor of Horrible Bosses, Final Destination 5, The Legend of Korra and The Game
 Flora Chan, 1991, Hong Kong television and film actress
 Jodi Cilley, producer
 Teddy Dunn, JD 2013, actor best known for portraying Duncan Kane on Veronica Mars
 Cameron Esposito, 2004, comedian
 Craig Finn, 1993, lead singer of The Hold Steady (and formerly Lifter Puller)
 Maile Flanagan, 1987, voice actress for Naruto
 Michael Frazier, 1958, producer
 Gary Gulman, 1993, comedian, runner-up in 2004's Last Comic Standing
 Alison Haislip, 2003, actress, TV host of Attack of the Show
 Elisabeth Hasselbeck, 1999, former reality show contestant on Survivor: The Australian Outback, former co-host of talk show The View; host on Fox & Friends
 Clinton Kelly, 1991, co-host of TLC's What Not to Wear,; co-host of ABC's The Chew; former magazine editor
 Christine Kane, singer-songwriter
 Kofi Kingston, professional wrestler 
 Tom McCarthy, 1988, actor, writer, and director; directed and co-wrote Academy Award Best Picture and Best Original Screenplay winner Spotlight
 Edwin McDonough, actor
 Ed McMahon, TV host and personality
 Mike Najarian, drummer, State Radio
 Eric Nam, 2011, Korean singer and entertainer
 Leonard Nimoy, 1952, actor
 Chris O'Donnell, 1992, actor
 PH-1 (rapper), 1989, Korean singer and rapper
 Ellis Paul, 1987, singer/songwriter
 Bryce Pinkham American stage and screen actor
 Amy Poehler, 1993, repertory player for Saturday Night Live and Upright Citizens Brigade; star of Parks and Recreation
 Greg Poehler, 1996, creator and star of Welcome to Sweden
 Rikishi, 1988, born Solofa F. Fatu Jr., professional wrestler
 David Smalley, 1985, singer for All, Dag Nasty, and DYS
 Skylar Spence, 2015, musician
 Tim Stack, 1978, actor
 Lori Trespicio, 2001, Real World X cast member, singer, writer
 Nancy Walls, 1988, comedian, wife of Steve Carell
 Lulu Wang, 2005, filmmaker
 Tracey Wigfield, 2005, comedy writer
 Wayne Wilderson, 1989, actor

Law, politics, and public service
 Bruce Ayers, member of the Mass. House of Representatives (1998–present) 
 Peter Blute, B.A. 1978, former United States Congressmen and radio talkshow host 
 Edward P. Boland, J.D. 1936, former United States Congressman; author of the Boland Amendment 
 Julio Borges, M.A. 1994, 8th President of the Venezuelan National Assembly (2017–2018). 
 Garrett J. Bradley, BA 1992 & JD 1995, member of the Mass. House of Representatives (2001-2016) 
 Joseph Brennan, 1958, former Governor of Maine, former United States Congressman 
 Scott Brown, J.D. 1985, former Massachusetts state senator; United States Senator 
 Wayne Budd, 1963, former United States Associate Attorney General 
William M. Bulger, J.D. 1961, former president of the Massachusetts state senate and former president of the University of Massachusetts 
 R. Nicholas Burns, 1978, U.S. Under Secretary of State for Political Affairs, board member of the Council on Foreign Relations, former US Ambassador to NATO, former US Ambassador to Greece 
 Andrea Cabral, 1981, Sheriff of Suffolk County, Boston, Massachusetts; first woman and first African-American to hold the position 
 Mike Capuano, J.D. 1977, United States Congressman 
 Edward Cashman, A.B. 1965, district court judge, State of Vermont 
 Paul Cellucci, 1970, J.D. 1973, former Governor of Massachusetts, former US Ambassador to Canada 
 Robert W. Clifford, J.D. 1962, Maine Supreme Court justice 
 John Cogliano, 1987, Massachusetts Secretary of Transportation
 David Condon, 1996, Mayor of Spokane Washington 
 John Connolly, former FBI agent, currently incarcerated stemming from his relationship with James J. "Whitey" Bulger
 Silvio Conte, 1949, J.D. 1949, former U.S. Congressman 
 John Curtin, 1954, former president, American Bar Association
 Bill Delahunt, J.D. 1967, U.S. Congressman 
 Salvatore DiMasi, 1967, Speaker of the Massachusetts House of Representatives 
 John Dooley, LL.B 1968, Vermont Supreme Court justice
 Bob Downes, J.D. 1968, Alaska Superior Court Judge 
 Robert Drinan, SJ, 1942, former United States Congressman, human rights advocate; only Catholic priest to serve in Congress 
 Joseph R. Driscoll Jr., BA, member of the Mass. House of Representatives (2003–2011) 
 Mark V. Falzone, B.A., member of the Mass. House of Representatives (2001–2011) 
 John F. "Honey Fitz" Fitzgerald, 1885, First Irish-Catholic mayor of Boston, grandfather of John F. Kennedy 
 Linda Dorcena Forry, 1996, second Haitian-American Massachusetts state representative 
Keith Francis (runner), B.A. 1976, world-class track athlete, Sr. Analyst, ATF and Boston College Trustee (2010-2011) 
 William F. Galvin, 1972, Massachusetts Secretary of State; 2006 Massachusetts gubernatorial candidate
 Joseph L. Gormley, 1937, M.A. 1939, FBI agent
 Michael S. Greco, J.D. 1972, president, American Bar Association 
 Patrick Guerriero, MA 1992, executive director, Log Cabin Republicans
 Ken Hackett, B.A. 1968, President of Catholic Relief Services
 Jane D. Hartley, B.A., United States Ambassador to France
 Margaret Heckler, J.D. 1956, former United States Congresswoman, former US Secretary of Health and Human Services, former US Ambassador to Ireland 
 Charles F. Hurley, 1913, Governor of Massachusetts 
 Cheryl Jacques, 1984, first openly gay state senator in Massachusetts; former president, Human Rights Campaign
 Sean M. Joyce, Deputy Director of the Federal Bureau of Investigation
 Karim Kawar, 1987, Jordanian Ambassador to the United States
 Bill Keating, 1974, MBA 1982, United States Congressman 
 John Kerry, J.D. 1976, United States Secretary of State, former United States Senator, 2004 Democratic candidate for President of the United States 
 Edward J. King, 1948, former Governor of Massachusetts and professional football player 
 Pat LaMarche, 1982, Maine gubernatorial candidate, 2004 Green Party vice-presidential candidate
 Wayne LaPierre, M.A., Executive Vice President of the National Rifle Association 
 Stephen Lynch, 1991, United States Congressman 
 Dannel P. Malloy, 1977, J.D. 1980, Governor of Connecticut 
 Ed Markey, 1968, J.D. '72, United States Congressman 
 Maeve Kennedy McKean, attorney and public health official in the Obama Administration
 Ernest Moniz, 1966, 13th United States Secretary of Energy
 Tip O'Neill, 1936, former Speaker of the United States House of Representatives 
 Grace Poe, 1991, former Chair of the Movie and Television Review and Classification Board in the Philippines. Senator of the Republic of the Philippines.
 Pierre-Richard Prosper, 1985, United States Ambassador-at-large for War Crimes Issues 
 Mike Rawlings, 1976, Mayor of Dallas, Texas
 Thomas Reilly J.D. 1970, Attorney General of Massachusetts, 2006 Massachusetts gubernatorial candidate
 Warren Rudman, J.D. 1960, former United States Senator and New Hampshire attorney general 
 Michael Rustad, Ph.D, Intellectual Property author, Professor at Suffolk University Law School 
 R.T. Rybak, 1978, Mayor of Minneapolis, Minnesota 
 Marie St. Fleur, J.D. 1987, Massachusetts state representative;  first Haitian-American elected to the Massachusetts Legislature; 2006 Massachusetts lieutenant gubernatorial candidate
 Thomas P. Salmon, 1954, J.D. '57, former Governor of Vermont 
 Bobby Scott, J.D. 1973, United States Congressman 
 Francis X. Spina, J.D. 1971, Massachusetts Supreme Court justice 
 Michael A. Sullivan, 1982, J.D. '85, Mayor of Cambridge, Massachusetts
 Michael J. Sullivan, 1979, United States Attorney for the District of Massachusetts; 2006 Massachusetts lieutenant gubernatorial candidate
 Amul Thapar, 1991, Judge, United States Court of Appeals for the Sixth Circuit (2017-?)
 Maurice J. Tobin, 1922, former mayor of Boston, former Governor of Massachusetts, former US Secretary of the Department of Labor 
 Marty Walsh, mayor of Boston, 2014–2021
 Kevin White, 1955, former mayor of Boston; longest serving 
 Diane Wilkerson, J.D. 1981, first African-American Massachusetts state senator
 Barbara Wright, B.S., member of the New Jersey General Assembly.
 Debra Wong Yang, J.D. 1984, United States Attorney for the Central District of California

Media and communication
 Tom Bowman, M.A., Pentagon reporter, National Public Radio
 Alina Cho, 1993, broadcast news reporter, CNN
 Jack Griffin, 1982, publisher, Parade magazine
 Elisabeth Filarski Hasselbeck, 1999, co-host, The View, ABC
 Jack King, NASA Public Affairs Officer
 Paul LaCamera, MBA 1983, president and general manager, WCVB-TV/Boston
 Steve Lacy, 1997, anchor, reporter, WCVB-TV/Boston
 Mike Lupica, 1974, author; sports columnist, New York Daily News
 Julianne Malveaux, 1974, M.A. '76, nationally syndicated columnist, author, producer
 Drew Massey, 1992, founder and publisher of P.O.V. magazine; founder of ManiaTV!
 John McLaughlin, M.A. 1961, executive producer and host of The McLaughlin Group, PBS
 Leo Monahan, 1950, sports journalist and recipient of the Elmer Ferguson Memorial Award
 Brian Murphy, religion editor,  Associated Press
 Frederick Pratson, 1957, travel writer
Mel Robbins, 1994, television show host and motivational speaker
 Luke Russert, 2008, congressional correspondent, NBC News
 Bob Ryan, 1968, sports columnist for the Boston Globe
 Herb Scannell, 1979, president, MTV Networks, Nickelodeon Networks
 Lesley Visser, 1975, sports broadcaster, ESPN
 Dave Wedge, 1993, author, journalist, VICE (magazine), Boston Strong (book), Boston Herald
 William O. Wheatley Jr., 1966, former Emmy Award-winning executive producer of NBC Nightly News; executive vice president, NBC News

Religion
 Thea Bowman, Ph.D. 1989, Franciscan sister, revered evangelist
 Timothy P. Broglio, 1973, Archbishop, Archdiocese for the Military Services, USA 
 Richard James Cushing, 1917, Cardinal-Archbishop of Boston
 Robert Drinan, SJ, 1942, human rights advocate, only Catholic priest ever to serve in US Congress
 Gregory John Hartmayer, O.F.M. Conv., M.Ed, 1992, Archbishop of Atlanta
 Frederick G. Lawrence, scholar of Bernard Lonergan
 Richard Lennon, 1969, Bishop of Cleveland
 Gerasimos Michaleas, M.A. 1986, Ph.D. 1993, Metropolitan of San Francisco; Archbishop, Greek Orthodox Archdiocese of America
 John Courtney Murray, 1926, M.A. 1927, prominent Jesuit theologian, architect of Vatican II
 Mark O'Connell, 1986, Auxiliary Bishop of Boston
 Fachtna O'Driscoll, Superior General of the Society of African Missions worldwide, 2013-2019
 William Henry O'Connell, 1881, Cardinal-Archbishop of Boston
 Deidre Palmer, Ph.D. 1989, President of the Uniting Church in Australia from 8 July 2018
 Edward Phillips, Eastern Deanery AIDS Relief Program, Archdiocese of Nairobi
 Francis A. Sullivan, SJ, 1944, M.A. 1945, Jesuit theologian and ecclesiologist

Science, technology, and medicine
 Rosina Bierbaum, B.S. and B.A. 1974, Dean at the University of Michigan School of Natural Resources and Environment and member of the National Science and Technology Council under Bill Clinton and Barack Obama
Jane A. Cauley, (MPH 1980, DrPH 1983), epidemiologist, University of Pittsburgh Cancer Institute
 Joseph L. Gormley, 1937, M.A. 1939, former chief of chemistry and toxicology for the FBI.
 Philip J. Landrigan, epidemiologist and pediatrician
 George D. LeMaitre, B.A. 1955, vascular surgeon, author, and surgical device inventor
 Aleksandar Totic, 1988, co-founder and former partner, Netscape
 Kevin J. Tracey, 1979, neurosurgeon and immunologist

Economics
Welles Crowther, 1999, equities trader who saved more than a dozen people during the September 11 attacks on the World Trade Center, during which he lost his own life 
Martha MacDonald, President of the International Association for Feminist Economics (IAFFE) from 2007 to 2008
Abdisalam Omer, Governor of the Central Bank of Somalia
Joseph T. Salerno, 1972, Austrian School economist, Senior Fellow at the Mises Institute

Athletics

Notable Boston College faculty

Chemistry 
 Amir Hoveyda, developer of the Hoveyda–Grubbs catalyst

Economics
 Arthur Lewbel, noted for econometrics, consumer demand analysis

English

 Gerald Dawe, Northern Irish; Burns Visiting Professor
 Elizabeth Graver, author
 Paul Mariani, author
 Suzanne Matson, author

Finance
 Alicia Munnell, former U.S. Assistant Secretary of the Treasury; researcher on Social Security and retirement

History
 Sheila Blair, Norma Jean Calderwood University Professor of Islamic and Asian Art (2000-2018)
 Jonathan M. Bloom, Norma Jean Calderwood University Professor of Islamic and Asian Art (2000-2018)
 Radu Florescu, distinguished Romanian historian, author of successful works on Vlad Dracula
 John Hume, former Northern Ireland politician, recipient of the 1998 Nobel Peace Prize
 Franco Mormando, historian of late Medieval and Baroque art, literature, and culture of Italy

Philosophy
 Richard Kearney, philosopher
 Peter Kreeft philosopher and Catholic apologist known for his work on Thomas Aquinas, Socrates, Blaise Pascal and C. S. Lewis
 David M. Rasmussen, Continental political philosopher, editor in chief of Philosophy and Social Criticism
 William J. Richardson, SJ, philosopher and psychoanalyst; known for his work on Martin Heidegger
 John Sallis, philosopher within Continental philosophy and hermeneutics

Political science
 William Bulger, former Massachusetts Senate president; former president, University of Massachusetts
 Dennis Hale, department chair from 1989-1997, author of The Jury in America: Triumph and Decline
 Robert S. Ross, associate of the Fairbank Center for East Asian Research at Harvard University; senior advisor of the security studies program at the Massachusetts Institute of Technology; member of the Council on Foreign Relations.
 Alan Wolfe, director, Boisi Center for Religion and American Public Life; bestselling author

Psychology
 William Ryan, social psychologist who coined the term "blaming the victim"
 Brinton Lykes, scholar-activist

Sociology
 Juliet Schor, leading expert on American consumerism, author

Theology
 Lisa Sowle Cahill, fellow of the American Academy of Arts and Sciences; former president of Catholic Theological Society of America
 Michael Himes, former academic dean of the Seminary of Immaculate Conception on Long Island, New York
 Ruth Langer, expert on Jewish liturgy
 Pheme Perkins, New Testament scholar; former president, Catholic Biblical Association of America

Music

 Peter Watchorn, Australian-born harpsichordist who has combined a virtuosic keyboard technique, musical scholarship and practical experience in the construction of harpsichords copied from original instruments of the 17th and 18th centuries.

References

Boston College
 
Boston College people